Patricia Howlin is Professor of Clinical Child Psychology at the Institute of Psychiatry, London, whose principal research interests focus on autism and developmental disorders including Williams syndrome, developmental language disorders and Fragile X. Howlin had a specific interest in the adult outcomes for individuals with autism. She published and presented on this subject extensively.

Howlin is a Fellow of the British Psychological Society, who has served as Chair of the UK Association of Child Psychology and Psychiatry and the Society for the Study of Behavioural Phenotypes She, along with Rita Jordan, were founding editors of the journal  Autism.

Selected publications

References

Howlin, Patricia
Autism researchers
English psychiatrists
Fellows of the British Psychological Society
Living people
British women psychiatrists
Year of birth missing (living people)